The Tower of Memories is a mausoleum located at Crown Hill Cemetery in Wheat Ridge, Colorado, US.

The building was designed with Gothic detailing by Charles A. Smith in 1926. After his firm failed in 1928, the architects William and Arthur Fisher were commissioned to continue the construction. World War II caused further delays to the building's construction. In 1948, the architect John Monroe was hired to complete the building.

See also
 National Register of Historic Places listings in Jefferson County, Colorado

References

External links
 Crown Hill Mortuary and Cemetery
 

Cemeteries in Colorado
Wheat Ridge, Colorado
Towers in Colorado
Tourist attractions in Jefferson County, Colorado
Buildings and structures in Jefferson County, Colorado
Gothic Revival architecture in Colorado
Cultural infrastructure completed in 1926
Moderne architecture in Colorado
National Register of Historic Places in Jefferson County, Colorado
Monuments and memorials on the National Register of Historic Places in Colorado